Classical Malay literature, also known as traditional Malay literature, refers to the Malay-language literature from the Malay world, consisting of areas now part of Brunei, Singapore, Malaysia, and Indonesia; works from countries such as the Philippines and Sri Lanka have also been included. It shows considerable influences from Indian literature (such as in the tales of Ramayana and Mahabharata) as well as Arabic and Islamic literature (including tales of the prophet Muhammad and his companions). The term denotes a variety of works, including the hikayat, poetry (in two major forms, the syair and the pantun), history, and legal works.

Selected works
Syair Siti Zubaidah Perang Cina
Syair Abdul Muluk
Hikayat Hang Tuah
Hikayat Amir Hamzah
Sejarah Melayu
Hikayat Bayan Budiman
Hikayat Raja-raja Pasai
Hikayat Banjar
Hikayat Abdullah
Undang-Undang Melaka

Selected authors
 Abdullah bin Abdul Kadir
 Hamzah Fansuri
 Nuruddin ar-Raniri
 Raja Ali Haji
 Tun Sri Lanang

See also
Indonesian literature, for works considered part of the modern Indonesian literary canon
Malaysian literature, for works considered part of the modern Malaysian literary canon
List of Hikayat

References

Malay-language literature